Murder by Numbers is a video game developed by Mediatonic and published by The Irregular Corporation. It was released on March 5, 2020 for Nintendo Switch and Windows, and on March 23, 2021 for Stadia. The game is a hybrid of visual novels with nonogram-style logic puzzles to progress the story.

Gameplay
The game follows TV actress-turned-detective Honor Mizrahi and her robot companion SCOUT as they find themselves involved in several murder cases. Presented in a visual novel style, similar to the Ace Attorney series, players are tasked with questioning witnesses and suspects and investigating areas for clues. Investigating brings up nonogram puzzles, which the player must solve to uncover a piece of evidence, which can then be presented to witnesses to advance the story. These nonogram puzzles are solved similar to many other computer-based nonogram puzzles, giving the player the ability to mark spaces that should be filled and those that should be empty as a method to track their work and make deductions towards solving the puzzle. A player can make any number of mistakes as they progress without penalty in most puzzles, but may ask for hints towards a solution. Some sections will require the player to complete a series of smaller nonogram puzzles within a time limit and without using "empty space" markers or hints.

The story is split into four cases, each with a Detective Rank that starts at F and increases as the player solves puzzles. Scoring enough points raises the rank and unlocks bonus puzzles outside of the main story, with more points awarded for not using hints. Earning an S rank in a case and clearing all of the unlocked bonus puzzles unlocks optional story sequences detailing SCOUT's backstory.

Story
Set in Los Angeles in 1996, Murder by Numbers follows Honor Mizrahi, the co-star of the TV detective show Murder Miss Terri. After she is fired from her job, she comes across SCOUT, a robot who was thrown away in a trash heap and has lost most of his memories. Honor discovers that the show's showrunner has been murdered. With SCOUT's help, Honor manages to solve the mystery behind the murder, but the murderer seemingly commits suicide. Honor soon finds herself involved in more murder mysteries, working alongside SCOUT to solve them as he tries to regain his lost memories.

Development
Murder by Numbers was developed by Mediatonic, an independent United Kingdom-based studio. Among those that have contributed include writer Ed Fear (from The Swords of Ditto), character designer Hato Moa (Hatoful Boyfriend) and composer Masakazu Sugimori (Phoenix Wright: Ace Attorney, Viewtiful Joe, and Ghost Trick: Phantom Detective).

The game was released on the Nintendo Switch on 5 March 2020, on Windows on 6 March 2020 and on Stadia on 23 March 2021.

Reception

Murder by Numbers was generally well received by critics on both platforms, according to review aggregator Metacritic, and Polygon included it in their feature on the best video games of 2020.

References

External links
 

2020 video games
Detective video games
Fiction about murder
Mystery video games
Nintendo Switch games
Nonograms
Indie video games
Single-player video games
Stadia games
Video games developed in the United Kingdom
Video games featuring female protagonists
Video games set in 1996
Video games set in Los Angeles
Visual novels
Windows games
Video games featuring black protagonists
The Irregular Corporation games